Hildesheimer Allgemeine Zeitung is a German newspaper published in Hildesheim, Germany. It was established as Hildesheimer Relations Courier, first published on 24 June 1705.

References

External links
 Official Website 

Daily newspapers published in Germany
Publications established in 1705
Mass media in Hildesheim
1705 establishments in the Holy Roman Empire